FC Den Bosch is a football club from 's-Hertogenbosch, Netherlands.

They were founded 18 August 1965, as FC Den Bosch/BVV. They are the successor of BVV (1906) and Wilhelmina (1890). Their stadium is called 'De Vliert', an 6,500 all-seater. Ruud van Nistelrooy started his professional career at this club. In 2005 they finished bottom of the Eredivisie and were relegated and currently compete in the Eerste Divisie.

History
The club were founded on 18 August 1965 as the successor to BVV, who were formed in 1906 and Dutch champions in 1948. They were champions of the 1965–66 Tweede Divisie B.,  They merged with Wilhelmina (1890) on 10 May 1967 to form F.C. Den Bosch '67, before being crowned champions of 1970–71 Eerste Divisie to secure promotion to the Eredivise for the first time in their history. Their first season in the Eredivisie, the 1971–72 season saw Den Bosch struggle with relegation all season, but they would eventually finish 16th, three points above the relegation zone, following a late-season upturn in form. Despite this the club lasted just two seasons in the Eredivise as they finished bottom of the 1972–73 Eredivisie and were relegated back to the Eerste Divisie.

Den Bosch struggled following their return to the Eerste Divisie, failing to finish in the top half until the 1977–78 season. However, come the turn of the decade, Den Bosch were consistently challenging for promotion, with the club competing in the promotion play-off for the 1980–81 season, only to lose out to De Graafschap. However, they would win the promotion play-offs for the 1982–83 season, marking their return to the Eredivisie. The club's first season back in the Eredivisie saw them finish 10th in the Eredivisie, before the next two seasons saw 6th-place finishes for the club, with the latter seeing Den Bosch finish just 3 points off the UEFA Cup qualification places.  This success did not last though as they were relegated back to the Eerste Divisie in the 1989–90 season, shortly after the club was renamed B.V.V. Den Bosch in 1988.

The club saw promotions to the Eredivisie in the 1991–92, 1998–99, 2000–01 and the 2003–04 seasons (the latter three as champions), only to be relegated back to the Eerste Divisie each time. The club also changed its name back to FC Den Bosch in 1992.
In the ten years following their relegation back to the Eerste Divisie, they competed in the promotion play-offs on six occasions bit failed to get promoted on any of them.

In the summer of 2018, after years of financial problems and bad performances in Eerste Divisie a Georgian businessman Kakhi Jordania, decided to invest in the club with intent to purchase. His ownership group was allowed to start making changes in the management, while they were awaiting the approval of KNVB. The club had a best season in years. The team finished as winter champions in Eerste Divisie, but could not continue their good form after the winter break. Den Bosch still managed to qualify for the promotion playoffs, where they lost to Go Ahead Eagles. After a year of due diligence, KNVB decided not to grant the new ownership group the right to purchase the club.

In November 2019, Den Bosch supporters racially abused SBV Excelsior player Ahmad Mendes Moreira in a match against the club, with Moreira having allegedly been called a 'negro and cotton-picker' prior to the match being halted after 30 minutes. Following the match, Moreira was labelled as a "pathetic little man" by Den Bosch's manager and the club originally stated that Moreira mistook 'crow sounds' for racist abuse, before later apologising for that statement. A few days after the match Den Bosch's manager apologised to Moreira. The "pathetic little man" label was about the way Moreira celebrated his goal and had nothing to do with racism. Moreira accepted these words. Following the incident and criticism from Netherlands internationals Memphis Depay and Georginio Wijnaldum, it was announced that players in the Dutch top two divisions would not play during the first minute of the following weekend's games in protest against racism in Dutch football as a result of the incident. In response to the incident, Den Bosch banned a number of supporters from attending games in January 2020. It was the first time a professional match in the Netherlands had to be halted as a result of racism.

In September 2021, Pacific Media Group, Partners Path Capital, Chien Lee, Randy Frankel and Krishen Sud acquired 53% of FC Den Bosch.

Club name
FC Den Bosch/BVV (1965–1967)
FC Den Bosch '67 (1967–1988)
BVV Den Bosch (1988–1992)
FC Den Bosch (1992–present)

Players

Current squad

Out on loan

Honours
Eredivisie/Dutch Champion
Winners: 1947–48 (as BVV)
Eerste Divisie
Winners: 1970–71, 1998–99, 2000–01, 2003–04
Promoted: 1982–83, 1991–92
Tweede Divisie
Winners: 1965–66
Promoted: 1962–63
KNVB Cup
 Runners-up: 1990–91

Below is a table with FC Den Bosch's domestic results since the introduction of professional football in 1956.

Club staff

Managerial history

 Ben Tap (1965–70)
 Jan Remmers (1970–74)
 Nol de Ruiter (1974–76)
 Ad Zonderland (1976–78)
 Rinus Gosens (1979–80)
 Ad Zonderland (1980)
 Hans Verèl (1981–84)
 Rinus Israel (1984–86)
 Theo de Jong (1986–89)
 Rinus Israel (1989–90)
 Hans van der Pluijm (1990–95)
 Chris Dekker (1995–96)
 Kees Zwamborn (1996–98)
 Martin Koopman (1998–00)
 Mark Wotte (2000)
 André Wetzel & Jan van Grinsven (2000)
 Jan Poortvliet (2000–01)
 Wiljan Vloet (2001–02)
 Gert Kruys (2002–04)
 Henk Wisman (2004–05)
 J. van Grinsven, F. van der Hoorn & W. van der Horst (2005)
 Theo Bos (2005–09)
 J. van Grinsven, F. van der Hoorn & W. van der Horst (2009)
 Marc Brys (2009–10)
 Alfons Groenendijk (2010–12)
 Jan Poortvliet (2012–13)
 Ruud Kaiser (2013–15)
 René van Eck (2015–16)
 Wiljan Vloet (2016–17)
 Wil Boessen (2017–19)
 Erik van der Ven (2019–21)
 William van Overbeek & Paul Verhaegh (2021)
 Jack de Gier (2021–)

Statistics

See also
Dutch football league teams

References

External links

 

 
Football clubs in the Netherlands
Football clubs in 's-Hertogenbosch
Association football clubs established in 1965
1965 establishments in the Netherlands